The Irresistible Man is a 1937 German romantic comedy film directed by Géza von Bolváry and starring Anny Ondra, Hans Söhnker, and Trude Hesterberg.

The film's sets were designed by the art directors Emil Hasler and Arthur Schwarz.

Cast

References

External links

Films of Nazi Germany
German romantic comedy films
1937 romantic comedy films
Films directed by Géza von Bolváry
Terra Film films
Tobis Film films
Films set in Paris
1930s German films